George Horace Elliot Fletcher (April 21, 1845 – June 18, 1879) was a professional baseball player who played outfielder in Major League Baseball for the 1872 Brooklyn Eckfords. Fletcher died of "asthenia due to phthisis pulmonalis" in 1879.

References

External links

Major League Baseball outfielders
Washington Nationals (NABBP) players
Brooklyn Eckfords players
19th-century baseball players
1845 births
1879 deaths
19th-century deaths from tuberculosis
Tuberculosis deaths in New York (state)
Sportspeople from Brooklyn
Baseball players from New York City
Burials at Green-Wood Cemetery